

Aglossa caprealis, the stored grain moth, is a moth species of the family Pyralidae. It is found globally, though its native range is presumably the western Palearctic or nearby regions, as in other Aglossa species.

The wingspan is 23–27 mm. The moth flies from June to August, depending on the location.
 
The larvae feed on dry plant waste, grain (e.g. maize), hay, straw and decaying manure. Sometimes, they even eat animal carcasses, suet, lard, pork rinds and other fatty materials.

Synonyms
Alternate but now-invalid scientific names of this species are:
 Acrobasis incultella Walker, [1866]
 Aglossa cuprealis (lapsus)
 Aglossa cuprialis (lapsus)
 Aglossa domalis Guenée, 1854
 Crambus capreolatus Haworth, 1809 (unjustified emendation)
 Pyralis aenalis Costa, 1836
 Pyralis caprealis Hübner, [1809]
 Tetralopha enthealis Hulst, 1886

Footnotes

References
  (1942): Eigenartige Geschmacksrichtungen bei Kleinschmetterlingsraupen ["Strange tastes among micromoth caterpillars"]. Zeitschrift des Wiener Entomologen-Vereins 27: 105-109 [in German]. PDF fulltext
  (2009): Markku Savela's Lepidoptera and some other life forms – Aglossa caprealis. Version of 2009-APR-25. Retrieved 2010-APR-12.

External links

 Lepidoptera of Belgium
 Microplepidoptera.nl 
 UK Moths

Moths described in 1809
Pyralini
Moths of Europe